Virginia Court is a Democratic member of the Montana Legislature. In 2010 she was elected to House District 52 which represents a portion of the Billings area. She was redistricted into House District 50 for the 2014 election. She did not run for reelection in 2018 due to term limits.

References

External links
 Montana state legislature page

Living people
Year of birth missing (living people)
Democratic Party members of the Montana House of Representatives
Montana State University alumni
Politicians from Billings, Montana
Place of birth missing (living people)
Women state legislators in Montana
21st-century American politicians
21st-century American women politicians